A custody suite is an area within a police station in the United Kingdom designed and adapted to process and detain those who have been arrested, or who are there for purposes such as answering bail.

Historically, all police stations had a small number of individual cells where offenders could be detained. However, in recent years most detainees are more likely to be taken to a large police station which are designated to hold prisoners.

Facilities

There are numerous facilities contained within the custody suite, which most commonly include:

 A holding cell where officers wait with prisoners awaiting entry to the suite. 
 A number of cells for detaining prisoners, often split into male, female and juvenile groups of cells.
 A prisoner processing area where custody officers (most commonly uniformed sergeants) process the prisoners presented to them by police officers
 Designated interview rooms, holding equipment used to conduct and record interviews with suspects for use as evidence.
 A medical room for use by police medical staff
 Consultation rooms where detained persons can consult with their legal representatives.
 Rooms used for video identification parades or similar.
 A room officers can complete the necessary arrest documentation after their prisoners have been legally and formally logged in as held in custody.

Procedure

Upon arrival at the suite, the police officer who has made an arrest presents the suspect at a desk before the custody officer explaining the reason and details of the arrest and evidence gained. If the custody officer is satisfied that the person has been lawfully detained, they will authorise further detention of the person. The detainee would then be asked a series of questions regarding their personal details and informed of their rights whilst in custody under the Police and Criminal Evidence Act 1984 or Criminal Procedure (Legal Assistance, Detention and Appeals) (Scotland) Act 2010 in Scotland. Before being allocated a cell and a record being made of the time detained, the detainee is usually searched with any item they are carrying removed and in some cases if forensic evidence has to be preserved. All items of clothing and personal items taken from the detainee are logged and held in a secure place until the detainee's departure.

The arresting officer will then complete the necessary documentation for the arrest and may conduct brief further enquiries (including a tape recorded interview with the suspect) before the suspect is brought before the custody officer again for disposal.  This disposal could take numerous forms, the most common being that the person is charged with an offence, given police bail in order for further investigation to be carried out, or released without any charge.

Independent custody visitors may make unannounced visits to custody suites to ensure that people being detained are treated properly.

External links
 Brief description of the Custody Suite

Police stations in the United Kingdom
Law enforcement in the United Kingdom
Imprisonment and detention